Tarsus or Tarsos was a town of ancient Bithynia, on the inland road east of Nicomedia. It is mentioned by Stephanus of Byzantium.

Its site is located near Tarsiye in Asiatic Turkey.

References

Populated places in Bithynia
Former populated places in Turkey
History of Sakarya Province